TL-599, also known as SB-8, is an extremely potent carbamate acetylcholinesterase inhibitor.

See also
Neostigmine
Miotine
T-1123
TL-1238
Physostigmine

References

Acetylcholinesterase inhibitors
Aromatic carbamates
Quaternary ammonium compounds
Phenol esters
Isopropyl compounds
Iodides
Carbamate nerve agents